Frederik Fekiač (born June 7, 1995) is a Slovak professional ice hockey defenceman currently playing for HC 21 Prešov of the Slovak Extraliga.

Fekiač previously played for HKm Zvolen, making his professional debut with the team during the 2012–13 season. He would divide his team between Zvolen and HC 07 Detva between 2015 and 2017 before joining Detva permanently in 2017.

He is the younger brother of centre Viktor Fekiač and the two have often been teammates throughout their careers.

Career statistics

Regular season and playoffs

References

External links

1995 births
Living people
HC 07 Detva players
Sportspeople from Zvolen
Slovak ice hockey defencemen
HKM Zvolen players
HC 21 Prešov players